Perizoma basaliata, the square-patched carpet moth, is a species of geometrid moth in the family Geometridae. It is found in North America.

The MONA or Hodges number for Perizoma basaliata is 7316.

References

Further reading

 
 

Perizoma
Articles created by Qbugbot
Moths described in 1862